V. Vikramraju (born 1 January 1934) is a former Indian cricket umpire. He stood in two Test matches between 1985 and 1986, including the second Tied Test, and five ODI games between 1984 and 1988.

See also
 List of Test cricket umpires
 List of One Day International cricket umpires

References

1934 births
Living people
Place of birth missing (living people)
Indian Test cricket umpires
Indian One Day International cricket umpires